Not So Brave is a compilation album of songs by the anarchist punk band Flux Of Pink Indians, released by Overground Records in 1997. Tracks 1-8 are from their demo "Strive," track 9 is an alternative mix, track 10 is an album version for the compilation album Wargasm, tracks 11-16 are their first demo, and tracks 17-25 are live tracks recorded at the Triad in the Bishop's Stortford.

Track listing
 Progress - 1:39
 Blinded By Science - 2:46
 The Fun Is Over - 2:04
 Some Of Us Scream, Some Of Us Shout - 1:49
 Tapioca Sunrise - 4:11
 Is There Anybody There? - 3:04
 Myxomatosis - 2:48
 Take Heed - 2:08
 Background of Malfunction - 2:38
 Tapioca Sunrise - 4:00
 Tube Disaster - 2:32
 Sick Butchers - 2:26
 Left Me to Die - 2:17
 Background of Malfunction - 3:00
 Is There Anybody There? - 4:02
 Life after Death - 4:17
 Sick Butchers - 2:14
 Take Heed - 2:21
 Progress - 1:37
 TV Dinners - 4:16
 Tube Disaster - 2:35
 Myxomatosis - 2:26
 They Lie, We Die - 3:02
 1970's have been made in Hong Kong - 3:08
 The Fun Is Over - 2:09

Personnel
 Colin Latter - vocals (all tracks)
 Derek Birkett - bass guitar, backing vocals (all tracks)
 Kev Hunter - guitar, backing vocals (tracks 1-8, 10, 17-25)
 Martin Wilson - drums (tracks 1-8, 17-25)
 Neil Puncher - guitar (Tracks 9, 11-16)
 Andy Smith - guitar (Tracks 9, 11-16)
 Sid Attion - drums (Tracks 9, 11-16)
 Spider (normally drummer for the band The System) - drums (Track 10)

References

2003 compilation albums
Flux of Pink Indians albums